In the non-canonical Gospel of Peter, Petronius is the centurion who is ordered by Pontius Pilate to guard the tomb of Jesus (Gos. Peter 8).

See also
Cornelius the Centurion
Apocrypha

1st-century Romans
Ancient Roman soldiers
Christian folklore
Petronii